A union suit is a type of one-piece long underwear, most often associated with menswear in the late 19th and early 20th centuries.

History
Created in Utica, New York, United States, it originated as women's wear during the 19th-century United States clothing reform efforts, as an alternative to constricting garments, and soon gained popularity among men as well.  The first union suit was patented in 1868 as "emancipation union under flannel".  Traditionally made of red flannel with long arms and long legs, it buttoned up the front and had a button-up flap in the rear covering the buttocks (colloquially known as the "access hatch", "drop seat", "fireman's flap", "crap flap", and other names).  Depending on the size, some union suits can have a dozen buttons on the front to be fastened through buttonholes from the neck down to the groin area.

The garment remained in common use in North America into the 20th century.  As its popularity waned, it became chiefly working men's wear, increasingly replaced by two-piece long underwear, also known as "long johns".  It was not uncommon until the mid-20th century for rural men to wear the same union suit continuously all week, or even all winter. Normally, no other type of underwear was worn with it.

Union suits are still commercially available, but because of their long association with "old fashioned" usage, and presumed "unsophisticated" rural wearers, they are considered comical.  The rear flap is also associated with humor, and in film and television the appearance of a union suit, viewed from behind, is a form of mild toilet humor. 

In Britain, this garment has often been known as "combinations".  When made from the traditional wool as recommended by Gustav Jäger, these are "woolly combinations"—sometimes abbreviated to "woolly coms".  In the Western US, they are known as "long handles".

Cultural references
Union suits, especially the rear flap, are used for comedic effect in the 1999 movie adaptation of The Wild Wild West, Back to the Future Part III, the TV series Rugrats, and the Family Guy episode "No Meals on Wheels".

The union suit makes an appearance in Louisa May Alcott's book Eight Cousins, as a preferred alternative to corsetry under the name 'Liberty Suit'; and in Dashiell Hammett's Maltese Falcon, where private-eye Sam Spade "put(s) on a thin white union-suit". It also makes a presence in the 2003 film Cold Mountain. The union suit is referred to several times in Laura Ingalls Wilder's books about pioneer life during the mid-to-late 19th century in the United States, and in Harper Lee's book, To Kill A Mockingbird. In the expansion Undead Nightmare for the game Red Dead Redemption, the player begins play wearing a union suit and can continue to wear it throughout the game, if desired. Dave Lister, a character from the British sci-fi sitcom Red Dwarf, can also be seen wearing one at various points throughout the series.  

In the HBO series Deadwood (2004-2006), which won an Emmy for costume design, and the sequel film Deadwood: The Movie (2019), the character of Al Swearengen (played by Ian McShane) is frequently seen in a union suit. He wears only the union suit in private, and when getting dressed in the morning, dons a matching three-piece suit over it. Although the union suit is visible even with the vest, this appears to be adequate for daily wear. For more formal occasions, the character added a dress shirt over the union suit, and a cravat or bow tie.

Gallery

See also 
Victorian dress reform
Onesie (jumpsuit)

Notes 

1860s fashion
19th-century fashion
20th-century fashion
Undergarments
One-piece suits
Winter clothes
Stereotypes of rural people